Alessandro Marchetti (17 March 1633 – 6 September 1714) was an Italian mathematician, noted for criticizing some conclusions of Guido Grandi, a student of Giovanni Alfonso Borelli who was influenced by Galileo and Aristotle.

In 1669 Marchetti completed the first known Italian vernacular translation of Lucretius' Epicurean epic poem De Rerum Natura.  He was denied permission to publish his translation, entitled Della Natura delle Cose, but it circulated widely in manuscript form before its first printing in 1717.

References

Works

Literature 
 Jonathan Israel, Radical Enlightenment, Oxford University Press, 2002. .
 Cosmo Gordon, A Bibliography of Lucretius, Rupert Hart-Davis, 1969. ASIN B000OJYRQ0.

External links 

 

17th-century Italian mathematicians
18th-century Italian mathematicians
1633 births
1714 deaths
People from Empoli